The Philippines–South Korea relations refers to the bilateral relations between the Republic of the Philippines and the Republic of Korea. The Philippines has an embassy in Seoul, while South Korea has an embassy in Manila. The relationship between the Philippines and South Korea can be classified as strong as the two countries have historically been and continue to be close diplomatic and military allies. They are also significant economic partners in terms of trade, immigration, and tourism. They are both close allies of the United States.

History
Moon Soon-deuk, considered as Korea's first person to learn a Philippine language (i.e. the Ilocano language), was able to use his interpretation skills conversing with the five Filipinos who were shipwrecked off Jeju Island in 1801 and were able to return home after nine years. He was the first recorded Filipino interpreter in Joseon dynasty. 
Moon, a survivor of shipwreck himself, was a ray merchant who lived on Ui Island, drifted to Japan's Okinawa Island with his uncle and four other colleagues, and then ended up seeing the Philippines, Macao and China. They were hit by the typhoon while on their way home from another island nearby after purchasing some fish known as "hongeo". Moon had a flair with foreign languages as he acquired the language in Yeosong (Luzon) - possibly Ilocano language, and had a sharp eye for the way the people lived. He was able to describe the towns, churches, houses, and how people prepared food in the northern Luzon region.

During World War II, the Japanese forcefully imported Korean soldiers to the Philippines to serve Japan's occupation from 1944 until the end of the war. During this time, Koreans were branded as "more cruel than the Japanese", however, a study published in 2012 found these rumors to be baseless. Only 2 Korean soldiers were ever convicted of war crimes in the Philippines. The study notes that the rumors may have likely been spread by the Japanese throughout the islands to incur hate against ethnic Koreans during and after the war. Bilateral relations between South Korea and the Philippines were established on March 3, 1949 upon the recognition of Republic of Korea as a sovereign state by the Philippines. The Philippines was the fifth state to recognize the Republic of Korea and the first ASEAN country to establish relations with the new nation. During the Korean War (1950-1953), the Philippines sent its forces to aid South Korea. It was the first Asian country to respond to the call of the United Nations (UN) to help South Korea when it was invaded by Chinese and North Korean communist forces.

As of 2009, there were 45,000 Filipinos residing in South Korea. In 2011, the South Korean Ministry of Foreign Affairs and Trade conducted a census and found that there were more than 90,000 South Koreans living in the Philippines, a fall of 16% from 2009 after a period of rapid growth in the population in the preceding decade. In 2017, civilian groups in the Philippines and South Korea joined forces to push for the inscription of Voices of the ”Comfort Women” in the UNESCO Memory of the World Programme. The inscription, however, was blocked by Japan.

Economic relations
South Korea is the sixth biggest trading partner of the Philippines, while the Philippines is the third most attractive Southeast Asian country for South Korean investors in 2011. South Korea also provides the biggest tourist market for the Philippines. In 2011, Koreans topped the list of tourists in the Philippines, followed by Japanese and Americans.

Military relations

Military relations between the two countries started during the Korean War when the Philippine government sent troops to enforce the United Nations campaign against the communist coalition of North Korea and China.

South Korea is an active arms donor and supplier for the Armed Forces of the Philippines.

They have donated numerous military hardware to the Philippines in the past, such as a number of F-5A/B fighter jets for the Philippine Air Force. These planes have since been decommissioned, but not before seeing ample use in the latter's domestic military operations against communist and Muslim separatist insurgents. In addition to this, South Korea had also donated a number of T-41 trainer planes.

In 2014, South Korea donated the ROKS Chungju, a Pohang-class corvette, to the Philippine Navy. She was handed over, refitted, and commissioned as the BRP Conrado Yap (PS-39) on August 5, 2019.The South Korean government also actively fulfills contracts for the Philippines for a variety of military hardware. These range from small arms, armored tactical vehicles, missile frigates, to multirole fighters.

In 2017, South Korea delivered the last batch of the 12 FA-50 Fighting Eagle light fighter jets ordered by the Philippines.

On October 16, 2018, Hyundai Heavy Industries laid down and began construction on BRP Jose Rizal (FF-150), the first missile frigate of her class and one of two that had been placed on order by the Philippine government. She was launched on May 23, 2019 and commissioned in May of the following year. Laying down and construction of the next missile frigate, BRP Antonio Luna (FF-151), also began on May 23, 2019. She was launched on November 8, 2019 and commissioned on March 19, 2021.

Controversies
In 2012, the first naturalized Korean lawmaker with Filipino descent received backlash from racist and xenophobic Korean netizens. The attacks were focused on the lawmaker's Filipino ethnic background. In 2016, a South Korean businessman was kidnapped and killed by rogue cops in the Philippines who accused him of being involved in the illegal drug trade. The Philippine government has apologized for the incident. In July 2020, a Philippine envoy resigned after allegedly sexually harassing a Korean woman in 2019. In September 2020, online conflict sparked between the two nations over Korean racism against Filipinos, where Korean users spouted racist remarks over the skin color and other physical attributes of indigenous Filipinos.

Country comparison

See also
Philippine Expeditionary Forces to Korea
Filipinos in Korea
Koreans in the Philippines
South Korean television dramas in the Philippines
Taft–Katsura Agreement
Root–Takahira Agreement
Mutual Defense Treaty (United States–Philippines)
Philippines–United States Visiting Forces Agreement
Mutual Defense Treaty (United States–South Korea)
United States–South Korea Status of Forces Agreement
Reserve Officers' Training Corps
Philippine ROTC
Korean Republic ROTC
Death of Jee Ick-Joo
North Korea–Philippines relations

References

 
Bilateral relations of South Korea
South Korea